Valle Mäkelä (born 2 February 1986, Laitila, Finland) is a Finnish motor racing driver.

Career
Mäkelä began his kart racing career at the age of five. In 2000 he became Finnish Champion in the ICA-J class.

In 2002, he began racing in Formula Ford in both the UK and Nordics with some success. In 2003, he finished 3rd in the British Formula Ford Championship class, winning one race and securing a further seven podiums. Remaining with Nexa Racing, Mäkelä won the 2004 British Formula Ford title with 506 points scored over the season, including ten victories. For 2005, he joined GR Asia in the World Touring Car Championship racing a Seat Toledo alongside Tom Coronel. His best result was a 10th place finish at Silverstone. In 2006, he returned to open wheel racing driving for Manor Motorsport in British Formula Renault. He ended the season in 13th position.  In 2007, he returned to Nexa Racing in the Formula BMW UK series and finished 5th in the championship, winning the first race at Brands Hatch.

After completing three races in Star Mazda in the USA in 2008, Mäkelä joined the Finnish GT3 Championship winning three races in the No Brakes Motorsport Porsche 997 GT3 Cup S. He would also race Hope PoleVision Racing's Oreca FLM09 in the Formula Le Mans Cup. Over 12 races, he scored two wins and finished 4th in the championship. In 2010 he competed in one race of the 24H Series, finishing 3rd for Westend Racing at the Hungaroring. Mäkelä competed in his first race in 6 years at the 2016 Riga Summer Race in Baltic Touring Car Championship driving a Lamborghini Gallardo.

Racing record

Career summary

Complete World Touring Car Championship results
(key) (Races in bold indicate pole position) (Races in italics indicate fastest lap)

References

External links

1986 births
Living people
People from Laitila
Finnish racing drivers
Formula Ford drivers
French Formula Renault 2.0 drivers
British Formula Renault 2.0 drivers
Formula BMW UK drivers
World Touring Car Championship drivers
Indy Pro 2000 Championship drivers
Manor Motorsport drivers
Sportspeople from Southwest Finland
24H_Series_drivers

Fluid Motorsport Development drivers
Morand Racing drivers